Sid Meier's Colonization is a video game by Brian Reynolds and Sid Meier released by MicroProse in 1994. It is a turn-based strategy game themed on the early European colonization of the New World, starting in 1492 and lasting until 1850. It was originally released for DOS, and later ported to Windows 3.1 (1995), the Amiga (1995), and Macintosh (1995). American video game publisher Tommo purchased the rights to this game in 2015 and digitally published it through their Retroism brand.

Colonization is much like a more-developed version of Sid Meier's previous game Civilization (1991) in visual design and handling, but the two have marked differences in gameplay. Instead of forging a nation from nothing, the player manages the cross-Atlantic expansion of an established one in the service of the Crown. As the colonies become more self-sufficient, their relationship with the colonial power declines from being beneficial to harmful, and to win the player must ultimately declare independence and defeat the Royal Expeditionary Force in battle.

Gameplay

The game begins in 1492. The player controls the colonial forces of either England, France, The Netherlands, or Spain; the other powers are then played by the computer. Each nation has unique abilities that favor certain strategies. There is a choice between a historical map (America) or a randomly generated map (the New World), and players may also construct their own map with the included scenario editor.

The journey begins with a ship and two units arriving at the new world; as the ship moves into the unknown, the map is revealed. Subsequently, the player makes landfall, explores the New World, meets the indigenous Indians, builds colonies and buildings, and improves and works the surrounding land. The ship can return to Europe to collect more colonists and sell and buy items.

The colonists can work the immediate land around the colony. Different map squares can yield different resources; for instance, most squares can produce food, while only forests can yield lumber. Harvested resources from the land, such as cotton or tobacco, can be manufactured and converted into commodities, such as cloth and cigars, and either used or sold. The prices of commodities in Europe fluctuate depending upon supply and demand. With money, the player is able to buy goods, fund faster building construction, recruit new colonists, or buy ships and artillery. The king may at different times raise colonial taxes to pay for a war taking place in Europe or for some other reason.

The player is also required to protect their colonies from potential invasion by equipping and stationing soldiers. Moreover, the player manages their citizens, educating them in various skills to increase their productivity in areas such as farming, gathering of resources, or manufacturing.

Players may send missionaries into Indian villages to convert them to Christianity. The Indians may accept and convert, or they may refuse and burn the missionary at the stake. If another colonial power has already established a mission in a village, a missionary may attempt to denounce them as heretics with an equal 50/50 chance of success or failure.

When waging war, the player has a basic colonial army consisting of militiamen, artillery, cavalry, and ships. Weapons and soldiers can be purchased from Europe; however, to win independence, the player will need to develop an indigenous armaments industry. Indians will initially only have braves and no horses or guns; over time they may obtain them via trade or defeating colonial forces in battle. Guns and horses must be available in a colony to equip citizens and turn them into soldiers. If a colonial power captures a colony, it will remain in their possession unless it is retaken by force. Indians will destroy a colony if they capture it.

Colonies are most often built on the coast; although they can be built inland, the player must build wagons to transport goods between colonies. In addition, wagons are necessary to trade with inland Indian villages. Goods may be sold to rival colonial powers, sent back to Europe for sale, or sold to Indian villages.

Colonists come in four types. The first is the basic free citizen, who has no particular skills but may be assigned to any job. If a citizen performs the same job for a certain length of time, the game may upgrade him to a specialist in that particular job. The second is the indentured servant. He is suitable for performing unskilled labor, but less productive at skilled trades. With enough time at a particular job, he may become a free citizen. The third is the petty criminal. Like the indentured servant, petty criminals are only useful for unskilled labor. Petty criminals can eventually become free citizens through military service. If they survive enough battles eventually they are promoted to indentured servant followed eventually by free citizen. All free citizens can become veterans by winning enough battles.

Citizens may also travel to an Indian village and learn a skill from the natives such as tobacco farming. The Indians will not permit petty criminals to live among them, but will teach free citizens and indentured servants. In addition, missionaries may convert Indians to Christianity and convince them to live in the player's towns, where they are a little better than free citizens at working the land (and unlike specialists, are better at any type of it), but poor at industrial trades.

Specialists are citizens who are trained and skilled at a specific profession. These can be free citizens, indentured servants, or petty criminals who learned the profession by doing the job, through education, or by visiting an Indian village (except criminals), or they can be pre-existing specialists (obtained via European immigration). Some professions, for example growing cotton, sugar and tobacco, can only be learned in Indian villages or in a colony, and are unknown in Europe. Eventually the player can build schoolhouses where they can teach their citizens to become specialists in specific professions. The player may at any time unassign a specialist and turn him back into an ordinary free citizen.

Horses can be imported from Europe. If any colony has two or more horses, they will breed up to a maximum number. An unskilled colonist (including a petty criminal) who enters a neutral or friendly Indian village on horseback may (rarely) be killed, may be given a gift, or may be promoted to be a specialist scout. Seasoned scouts have a better chance to meet with a favorable reaction when entering a village, and an improved chance of discovering a fabled "Fountain of Youth" when investigating ancient ruins—which will provoke a sudden influx of potential colonists of all types to the player's European port. Further, mounted soldiers are more effective and have a better survival rate than dismounted infantry.

Each colonial power has certain bonuses that make them unique and different from each other. Aside from European colonial powers, the NPC powers include eight Native American tribes, in four main categories. Each Native American settlement can convert one regular colonist into a specialist. More advanced tribes (Incas and Aztecs) live in larger cities. Analogous to "Wonders of the World" in the Civilization series of games, social and industrial advances are achieved by the addition of "Founding Fathers" to the "Continental Congress", which are gained by generating a sufficient number of "Liberty Bells" through the colonial pride of settlers. These are all named after real historical figures, such as Francisco Vásquez de Coronado and Pocahontas.

One main driving impulse in Colonization is the harvesting of natural resources, such as lumber (for building), ore (for manufacturing), and food (for population growth). Squares on the map have basic values of resource output (depending on the type of terrain and if a river runs through it), but certain "prime" squares have double or higher output values, making them highly desirable. Pioneers can, at the cost of expending tools, create roads on tiles, increasing their yield and removing terrain movement penalties, or remove features such as forests to make room for agriculture. They can also "plow" flat terrain to increase agricultural yields.

The ultimate goal of the game is winning independence from the mother country. When the player is producing sufficient Liberty Bells, he may choose to declare independence. He then has to defeat most of the King's army to win, which is not an easy task as the royal army and navy are individually more powerful and usually more numerous than the player's colonial forces, although the King's troops are unused to fighting in the New World and are more easily defeated in rough terrain. Other colonial powers may help with the enterprise, analogous to the French intervention in the American Revolutionary War. Of course, if the player has a large enough treasury, another foreign power may provide military aid in the form of mercenaries.

Development
Computer Gaming Worlds "The Rumor Bag" column reported in April 1994 that "MicroProse is working on a game like Sid Meier's Civilization that covers the Age of Colonization".

GOG.com released an emulated version for Microsoft Windows, Linux and Mac OS X in 2012.

Reception 

Sales of Sid Meier's Colonization surpassed 350,000 copies by September 1997.

In 1996, Colonization was ranked the fourth best game of all time by Amiga Power. It was named the 52nd best computer game ever by PC Gamer UK in 1997.

Next Generation stated that "MPS Labs borrowed heavily from classic hits of the past to create a surprisingly addictive title with a flavor all its own."

Remakes
FreeCol released in 2003, is an open-source and fan-made remake of Colonization. It is under continued development.

The 2008 release Civilization IV: Colonization is a Firaxis remake of the original Colonization for Microsoft Windows. It uses the upgraded Civilization IV engine and features the original gameplay (with some changes, particularly to colonist education), 3D graphics, an updated AI, and multiplayer support.

References

External links

1994 video games
4X video games
Age of Discovery video games
Amiga games
Colonization
Classic Mac OS games
Colonialism in popular culture
DOS games
Games commercially released with DOSBox
Historical simulation games
Linux games
MicroProse games
Colonization
Single-player video games
Tommo games
Turn-based strategy video games
Video games about the American Revolution
Video games developed in the United States
Video games scored by Allister Brimble
Video games scored by Jeff Briggs
Video games set in the 18th century
Windows games